The first Tommy Murphy Cup, a Gaelic football tournament, was held in 2004. All those teams that lost in the early rounds of the championship were invited to play, but only four actually competed. Clare were the inaugural champions, Ordan O'Dwyer scoring the crucial goal in the final.

Results

Tommy Murphy Cup
Tommy Murphy Cup